Vietnamese irredentism, also known as Greater Vietnam, is an irredentist and nationalist claim concerning redemption of territories of Vietnam. The idea is associated with Vietnamese revisionism, targeting at least to regain control over territories that used to be inhabited by ancient Baiyue peoples in the past.

Background
The Baiyue people, of which the modern Vietnamese people (also called "Viet" or "Kinh") are descended from, have long inhabited in a vast variety of land of what would be known as modern China, Vietnam and Laos. As for the result of migration, the Viet tribes moved southward and eventually established itself in what would be known as northern Vietnam and southern China today, which became the ancestral homeland of Vietnamese people. Overtime, the Vietnamese people managed to overcome four Chinese domination of Vietnam, and further expanded its territory south and westward, known as Nam tiến and war with Laos and the Tai tribes, which slowly granted Vietnam's political power to weight and control Laos and Cambodia. Also, there were also northern expansions toward Chinese territory, and sea expeditions to gain control over Malay peninsula, though it was short-lived. Nonetheless, during these expansions, Vietnamese imperial rulers adopted Vietnamization policy, hoping to subjugate and Vietnamize people from the land they conquered.

French imperialism at the 19th century resulted in the establishment of French Indochina, where French colonial rulers adopted a divide-and-rule policy, but this also resulted with Cambodia and Laos being fully absorbed into much-larger Vietnamese nation. Though being equally ruled by France, in reality, the Vietnamese dominated political will in both Laos and Cambodia, and economy of Vietnam was far bigger than its fellow French Indochinese colonies. This trend continued even when the French were expelled from Vietnam following the First Indochina War, only to be disrupted by the Vietnam War later. However, once the Vietnam War ended, the Vietnamese communists, who emerged victoriously in this conflict, managed to control Laos and Cambodia throughout its communist puppets, as well as trying to expand into Thailand. In 1979, the Cambodian–Vietnamese War broke out when the Khmer Rouge under Pol Pot became increasingly afraid of Vietnamese influence and domination, but this resulted in a 10 years occupation of Cambodia by the Vietnamese. Following Đổi mới in 1986, which Vietnam reformed and rejoined global community, Vietnam started to focus on its internal affairs and retreated from Laos and Cambodia.

Greater Vietnam irredentism

China
Due to historical conflict and numerous territorial changes with China, especially regarding Baiyue, some Vietnamese have irredentist claim to part of southern China.

The claim of Chinese territory was thought to have come from the era of Tây Sơn dynasty in late 1790s, when Emperor Quang Trung sought to claim entire of southern China's Hainan, Guangxi and Guangdong to be parts of Vietnamese territory dated from ancient Baiyue inhabitants before the Qin dynasty's southward expansion. However, the irredentist claim would soon die out following Quang Trung's death and it was not until 20th century that Vietnamese nationalism began to rise that saw its revival.

In the early 20th century, a Vietnamese Jesuit and nationalist, Lương Kim Định, published an annual of Vietnamese history and culture, where he claimed that the Huaxia culture that China has obtained could be traced from ancient Vietnamese, and Chinese state's cultural acquisition was the result of Chinese imperialism, and Vietnamese nation had been much larger and deeper inside Chinese territory, began from the beneath of Yangtze, citing entire of southern China as part of Vietnamese territory.

Vietnamese nationalists also pointed from its irredentist movement of the ancient pride, when General Lý Thường Kiệt conquered southern China at 1075 before retreating to Vietnam a year later, and several times have stressed the desire to reclaim the land, and that the people of South China have not forgotten its Vietnamese origin.

Laos and Cambodia
Being fellow neighbors, Laos and Cambodia have long been seen as backwaters of Vietnam due to being strongly under prey of Vietnamese influence, even though Laos and Cambodia are culturally distinct from Vietnam.

In the past, Vietnam had fought and managed to control and influence both Laos and Cambodia, with the former experienced longer Vietnamese domination after several conflicts. Meanwhile, the latter was slowly absorbed to Vietnamese influence in 17th century, but it was not until 19th century that Vietnam finally established its control and wrecking Siam together. In all of Vietnam's irredentist sentiment to Laos and Cambodia, its sentiment toward Cambodia is the strongest and most hostile one, often led to conflict between two countries. The most recent Cambodian–Vietnamese War was an example.

Meanwhile, in recently, the East Laos meme is often being used to represent Vietnam and is frequently used by Vietnamese internet users during its looming tensions with China. Although the meaning is mostly memetic, it sometimes caused controversy that Vietnam attempted to reinforce its control of Laos by mimicking the latter's name, given Vietnam's large population and the Laotian communist regime being a puppet of the Vietnamese.

Thailand, Myanmar and Malaysia
Vietnamese irredentism is also sometimes pointing to Thailand, Malaysia and Myanmar, though it directs the most to the former.

Much of the irredentist sentiment against Thailand and Myanmar could be traced from the root of Vietnamese imperialism in 15th century, when Vietnam fought Laos and gained control of a part of northern Siam and eastern Myanmar in a short-lived time. As the Burmese Empire, even during its peak, had never managed to conquer Vietnam while Vietnam had managed to occupy a part of Burmese territory, the Vietnamese irredentism prided itself for not being under Burmese rule.

Its conflict with the Siamese, which began in 18th century, had been one of the prolonged war, in which Vietnam slowly transformed to become a Southeast Asian power despite Siamese efforts to prevent it. This had fostered a significant national fear of Siamese and later Thais about growing Vietnamese irredentist threat, which was enhanced by the outcome of Cambodian–Vietnamese War and subsequent Vietnamese military raids and occupation in Thai border. Thus, in Thailand always ran a fear of Vietnamese eventual occupation, leading to the country supporting Khmer Rouge to deter Vietnamese expansionism.

Vietnamese irredentism toward Malaysia was much weaker and less significant, and it was never documented in Vietnamese historical accords. However, during the 15th century, the Vietnamese, which proceeded the most powerful army in Southeast Asia, had planned for a naval expedition against Malacca Sultanate and launched naval attacks on Malay ships and sailors. Following the pressure by the Ming dynasty, the Vietnamese backtracked and eventually abandoned the plan to conquer Malacca.

Internal Vietnam

Champa

The Kingdom of Champa was once an ancient kingdom in what would be modern-day Central Vietnam, influenced by the extension of Indian civilization. The entity had been historically Vietnam's major rival at first, and had launched an invasion against the infant Đại Cồ Việt, but militarily, it was unsuccessful in deterring Vietnamese military advance. The relationship between two, if not to say, often fluctuated between peace and hostility. However, with the end of the Fourth Chinese domination of Vietnam, increasing Vietnamese militarism had led to the demise of Champa and its eventual fate of being conquered at the 1471 war. Since then, there had been a number of rebellions against Vietnamese rule by the Chams since and was marred by growing Islamization of Chams, the most severe happened in the 19th century when Katip Sumat uprising coincided with Ja Thak Wa uprising, where Islam was introduced as a weapon of resistance against Vietnamese Empire; and in 20th century when the United Front for the Liberation of Oppressed Races (FULRO) was established to fight off Vietnamese persecution. In response, the Vietnamese military began persecuting Chams and drafted them into its rank, while there were persecutions over their Hindu and Islamic faith.

Central Highlands

The Central Highlands was incorporated into Vietnamese territory by the end of 18th century but only got formal control from 19th century onward. For the first decades under Nguyễn dynasty, the Vietnamese paid little interest to the region and prohibited Vietnamese settlers from ever going here. But with the French conquest, the Vietnamese had taken significant interests due to large natural resources in the region. Its strategic location is also another important reason for Vietnam to begin to increase its control over the land. To counter growing Vietnamese nationalism, the French supported Christianization of Montagnards, which would serve as a pretext for future conflict.

Eventually, the outbreak of Vietnam War erupted the demographic imbalance when Vietnamese settlers became increasingly populous, displacing the indigenous Montagnards. This had influenced these people to take up arms and rebelled against Vietnamese, no matter the north or south. The United Front for the Liberation of Oppressed Races was established with object of fighting against Vietnamese imperialism. In response, both North Vietnam and South Vietnam maltreated the Montagnards, and the United States was accused of doing nothing to prevent it. The persecution trend continued even after 1975, and remains extremely severe. In addition, to finally reinforce its control, Vietnamese government, both in the past to present, has directly sponsored Vietnamese migration to Central Highlands, much to the dismay of Montagnards.

Mekong Delta

The Mekong Delta had been historically under the Khmer Empire, where the Khmer Krom, a subgroup of the larger Khmer people, inhabited the land. Up until 17th century, the land had been mostly marked with little interests even during the height of the Khmer civilization. However, due to the decline of Cambodia and wars with Siam, the Cambodian court had to take refuge and neglected the Mekong Delta's interests. On the same time, due to southern expansion, Vietnamese settlers had begun to takeover the Mekong Delta. The takeover began with most of its population were settlers, and later doubled by a large number of Chinese refugees fleeing from the Manchu Qing dynasty. These Chinese refugees went Vietnamized in majority and helped expanding Vietnamese military and political privileges over the Delta with the blessing from Nguyễn lords. There had been several attempts by Cambodian Court to restrict Vietnamese migration to even recovering of territory, but was unsuccessful. As for the result, Cambodia was never able to make any significant step, and lost the territory in the end of 18th century. The conquest meant that Vietnam acquired the longest sea border for any mainland Southeast Asian countries.

The Khmer Krom, which had traditionally aligned itself with Cambodia, were dissatisfied with Vietnamese rule and had tried to re-incorporate the land to Cambodia. As a consequence, Emperor Minh Mạng decided to Vietnamize the Khmer population "We must hope that their barbarian habits will be subconsciously dissipated, and that they will daily become more infected by Han [Sino-Vietnamese] customs." The trend was not prevented by the French even after French colonization. In 1949, French President Vincent Auriol, in a move that favored Vietnamese irredentism, granted the land to Vietnamese control. The Khmer Krom's dissatisfaction led to the fight against Vietnam during the Vietnam War, and allied with the FULRO. Ultimately, Khmer Krom began to face persecution, though in comparison to the Montagnards and Chams, was less severe.

Spratly and Paracel
Like many nations involving in the islands' disputes, Vietnam has been a major participant. For the Vietnamese, controlling these islands have been instrumental in reinforcing historical claim in a very divisive series of islands' claims containing the People's Republic of China, the Republic of China (Taiwan), the Philippines, Malaysia, and Brunei.

In Vietnamese irredentist version, the Paracel Islands were first discovered by a group of naval force working under the Nguyễn lords, known as Hoàng Sa group (hence the Vietnamese name), and this was done at 1686, while China was busy concentrating on its internal affairs. The same issue came with Spratly islands, with Vietnamese source claims to have been traced from 17th century.

During the Vietnam War, North Vietnam ceded its territorial claim over these islands to China, although China did not have any major military activities there until 1973, probably in order to maintain support from the Chinese and Soviets to reinforce for its military against the south and the United States. However, the 1974 Battle of the Paracel Islands was instrumental on letting the North to eventually withdraw its recognition of China's claims and rekindled back the territorial disputes over these islands, as the unified communist authority of Vietnam decided to inherit both the claim of the late Republic against China. Since then, the two nations later fought for control in the Johnson South Reef Skirmish, this time ended with another Chinese victory, but has left a denting legacy on eventual tensions between the two countries as South China Sea disputes evoked back from 2010s and further boosting irredentist sentiment.

Further developments
After the economic reforms in 1986, Vietnam focused less on irredentist movement and instead looking to focus on the development of internal economy and society and to overcome the war's trauma. Thus, irredentist movement was disregarded initially in order to develop friendly relations with most of its former rivals and to ensure internal stability. The country's growing economic strength has provided Vietnam significant backup in international profile, though not without controversies.

However, as for the result of growing tensions with China since 2010s, Vietnamese irredentism became increasingly popular among public, where it's also being reinforced by looming nationalist fervors. Advocates of Vietnamese nationalism have sought to re-promote the irredentist claims on southern China and Paracel, Spratly Islands as a counter to growing Chinese irredentism.

There have been criticisms over Vietnamese irredentist claims. Several Vietnamese scholars believed the irredentist claim is nothing more but another version of radical Chinese and Thai irredentism, citing it to be "unrealistic".

See also
Vietnamese nationalism
Anti-Vietnamese sentiment

References

External links
Irredentism, Nationalism and a Looming Asia-Pacific War
SOUTH CHINA SEA DISPUTE: IRREDENTISM, POLICY CHANGES AND THE THREAT PERSPECTIVE
Try to find old Vietnamese border
Border of Old Vietnam
Bach Viet (Baiyue) Civilization
Different views of history: Shades of irredentism along the Laos–Cambodia border
Claiming Phu Quoc/Koh Tral: Irredentism as a Recurrent Theme of Cambodian Domestic Politics
Vietnam’s Quest for Influence and Its Implications for the Management of Border Disputes with Laos and Cambodia
Sino‐vietnamese regional rivalry
Understanding Vietnam's southward expansion (part 1)
Understanding Vietnam's southward expansion (part 2)
LAOS: The Vietnamese Connection

Vietnam
Vietnamese nationalism
Politics of Vietnam